Doug Herzog (born July 16, 1959) is an American television executive. He was formerly the president of Viacom Music and Entertainment Group, he oversaw MTV, VH1, Logo, Comedy Central, Palladia, TVLand and Spike.  Herzog has been credited with evolving the MTV brand by steering the network away from music related programming.

Career
Herzog received his B.S. degree in Mass Communications from Emerson College in 1981. He started reggae show at the college radio station in 1978, and it ended up becoming the most popular show on the station, ultimately running every day for 35 years. 

He moved to Los Angeles to work at CNN when it was created in 1981, and became a segment producer at Entertainment Tonight in 1983. 

Herzog's Viacom career began in 1984 when he joined MTV. Herzog started as MTV News Director, creating the networks influential news department and eventually rising to President MTV Productions overseeing all the channel's original programming. Herzog developed and supervised many of the brands most enduring and groundbreaking franchises including The Real World, Unplugged and Road Rules, as well as the network's signature events The MTV Movie Awards and The MTV Video Music Awards. 

Herzog launched shows such as The Daily Show with Jon Stewart, The Colbert Report, South Park, The Real World, UFC, Key & Peele, Inside Amy Schumer, Hot in Cleveland, Workaholics, Tosh.0, and Younger.

In 1993, he was named president of the MTV Productions unit.

Herzog then moved to the position of President of Comedy Central in 1995.

Herzog left Viacom to work as President of USA Network igniting the network's original programming with the award-winning Monk. Herzog also served as President of Entertainment for FOX Broadcasting Company where he green-lit the Emmy Award-winning Malcolm in the Middle and three animated sitcoms The PJs, Family Guy and Futurama

Herzog returned to Viacom in 2004 as the President of Viacom's Music Entertainment Group where he oversaw Comedy Central, MTV, VH1, Spike, TVLand and Logo. Herzog left the company in January 2017 after spending almost 27 years with the company.

In 2018, Herzog was hired as senior Creative Consultant for the Quibi Streaming Service. The service has since shut down due to lack of viewership.

In 2022, Herzog launched a podcast about the history of basic cable television programming in America.

Awards
Herzog has been inducted into the Broadcasting and Cable Hall of Fame.

References

External links
Herzog bio at Comedy Central

New York Times feature

1959 births
American television executives
20th-century American Jews
Comedy Central executives
Emerson College alumni
Living people
Fox Broadcasting Company executives
USA Network executives
MTV executives
Presidents of Fox Broadcasting Company Entertainment
21st-century American Jews